The 2015–16 Dallas Sidekicks season was the fourth season of the relaunched Dallas Sidekicks professional indoor soccer club. The Sidekicks, a Pacific Division team in the Western Conference of the Major Arena Soccer League, played their home games in the Allen Event Center in Allen, Texas. The team was led by new head coach Simon Bozas and assistant coach Nick Stavrou. The team struggled to recover from off-season turmoil and finished with a 7–13 record, missing the playoffs for the first time in the arena era.

Season summary
The season began with a closer-than-expected loss to the Missouri Comets in front of the revived team's then-smallest home crowd to date. An overtime loss at home to the Las Vegas Legends was followed by defeat on the road against the Syracuse Silver Knights. A road loss to the Tacoma Stars was followed two days later by a win in Tacoma. Dallas played their next four games at home, all victories, defeating the San Diego Sockers, Brownsville Barracudas, and Saltillo Rancho Seco. While 2016 opened with a win, the Sidekicks lost a road game to Saltillo, won twice at Brownsville, then dropped consecutive home games to Tacoma, the Ontario Fury, and Soles de Sonora bringing their record to 7–8. Road losses to the Las Vegas Legends and Ontario dropped the team to 7–10 and eliminated Dallas from playoff contention for the first time in the arena era. Dallas ended its season with three losses in four days, losing the final home game in overtime to the Milwaukee Wave before roadtrip losses to Sonora and San Diego. The final 7–13 record is one of the worst winning percentages in overall team history.

History
With some continuity in ownership, staff, and players, the Sidekicks claim the heritage of the original Dallas Sidekicks that won four championships as members of four leagues (MISL I, CISL, PSA/WISL, and MISL II) while playing at Reunion Arena in Dallas from 1984 to 2004. The new Sidekicks debuted as members of the Professional Arena Soccer League at the Allen Event Center in November 2012, posting a 13–3 record during the 2012–13 season before falling to the Rio Grande Valley Flash in the playoffs. For the 2013–14 season, the Sidekicks improved to 14 wins and 2 losses. For the 2014–15 season, the Sidekicks amassed a 14–6 record in the regular season and finished second in the Central Division. Dallas defeated Oxford City FC of Texas in the Southern Division Semi-Finals before losing to the Monterrey Flash in the Division Finals.

Off-field moves
Head coach Tatu and the team parted ways in June 2015 over a payment dispute. The situation was resolved in October 2015 and Tatu rejoined the team as an ambassador of the sport.

Owner Ronnie Davis sold the team to Sidekicks Sports Management, LLC, in October 2015. Davis initially retained a minority share of the franchise and briefly remained with the Sidekicks as a consultant, until the Sidekicks Sport Management group: Bob Heckel, Sean Porter, and Craig Porter decided to lead the team in a different direction than Davis.

On January 30, 2016, the team distributed a Donruss-produced 20-card team set to fans in attendance at that night's game. The set includes cards for 20 Sidekicks players, including Jamie Lovegrove who had been kept off the field for the entire season by visa issues.

Roster moves
The team formally signed new head coach Simon Bozas on October 20, 2015, after the completion of the sale of the team. The bulk of the Sidekicks initial roster was put under contract on November 6 with the rest of the opening day roster signed on November 11 and 12. On November 19, Dallas signed forward Arthur Ivo, defender Clint Ritter, goalkeeper Paul Hason, and midfielder Franck Mbemba. Defender David Kamali joined the team on December 2, 2015. On January 6, 2016, Dallas signed forward Gabe Arredondo and defender Clark Binning.

Schedule

Regular season

 Originally scheduled for January 31, 2016, at Missouri Comets. Rescheduled after collapse of Hartford City FC.
 Originally scheduled for October 24, 2015. Rescheduled to delay start of Dallas' season.

Personnel

Player roster
As of January 19, 2015

Other players that logged time on the field for the Sidekicks this season include midfielders #28 Paolo Da Silva, #27 Henrique De Souza, and #21 Fernando Garza.

Staff
The team's new ownership group for this season is Sidekicks Sports Management, LLC. Key front office personnel included Chief Operations Officer Bob Heckel, Chief Financial Officer Craig Porter, vice presidents Kevin Lindstrom and Pablo Benitez, plus Ronnie Davis as director of sponsorships.

Game day staff included head coach/general manager Simon Bozas and assistant coach Nick Stavrou. The team's athletic trainer was Steve Parker. The team's public relations and communications director was Melissa Smith. The director of events was Nicolle Osborn and the director of operations was Sean Miller.

All of the Sidekicks' home games were aired live in high-definition on Time Warner Cable Sports Channel. The broadcast team included Norm Hitzges on play by play, former Sidekicks coach Gordon Jago with color commentary, and team historian Alan Balthrop. Most MASL games were streamed by Go Live Sports with select games streamed live by ESPN3. The in-arena announcer was John Clemens.

Awards and honors
On December 9, 2015, forward Cameron Brown was named to the MASL's Team of the Week for his offensive efforts in a pair of road games against the Tacoma Stars. He was then chosen as Player of the Week in a poll of MASL fans.

References

External links
Dallas Sidekicks official website
Dallas Sidekicks at The Dallas Morning News
Dallas Sidekicks at Allen American

Dallas Sidekicks (2012–present) seasons
Dallas Sidekicks
Dallas Sidekicks 2015
Dallas Sidekicks
Dallas Sidekicks